Troedyrhifuwch Halt railway station co-served the village of Tir-Phil, in the historic county of Glamorgan, Wales, from 1908 to 1916 on the Rhymney Railway.

History
The station was opened on 1 April 1908 by the Rhymney Railway. It closed on 1 January 1916.

References

Disused railway stations in Caerphilly County Borough
Railway stations in Great Britain opened in 1908
Railway stations in Great Britain closed in 1916
1908 establishments in Wales
1916 disestablishments in Wales